The Type 83 122 mm howitzer is a towed howitzer used by the People's Liberation Army of China.  The gun system is developed from the earlier Chinese Type 54 howitzer which was in turn developed from the Soviet 122 mm howitzer M1938 (M-30).

Specification

Design 
The basic design of the type 83 is similar to the earlier M-30.  However, the Type 83 has a split-shield which is similar to that used by the 152 mm towed gun-howitzer M1955 (D-20) and has a multi-baffle muzzle brake.

References

External links 
 http://news.bbc.co.uk/2/hi/south_asia/2156872.stm

122 mm artillery
Field artillery of the Cold War
Artillery of the People's Republic of China
China–Soviet Union relations